The Najaf Seminary, also known as the al-Hawza Al-Ilmiyya (الحوزة العلمية), is the oldest and one of the most important Shia seminaries (hawza) in the world. It is located in the city of Najaf in Iraq. The school also operates a campus in Karbala, Iraq.

It is located near the Imam Ali Mosque. It was established in the 11th century by Grand Ayatollah Shaykh al-Tusi.

History
Shaykh Tusi went to Baghdad to continue education. After 12 years, he was forced to leave Baghdad and go to Najaf for sectarian differences. He established the seminary in Najaf in 430 AH (the 11th century AD), which continued as a center of study until the establishment of modern Iraq in 1921. He died in 460 AH (1067 CE). The seminar was one of the biggest and most important hawza of the world for educating and training Shia clerics.

Subjects
The subjects taught at the seminary include:
 Mantiq (Logic)
 Usul al-Fiqh (Principles of Jurisprudence)
 Fiqh (Jurisprudence)
 Tafsir al-Qur'an (Qur'an Exegesis)
 Ulum al-Qur'an (Qur'an Sciences)
 Ilm al-Hadith (The Study of Traditions)
 Ilm ar-Rijal (Science of Narrators)
 Tarikh (History)
 Aqaid / Kalam (Theology)
 Lugha (Language Studies)
 Falsafa (Islamic Philosophy)
 Irfan (Islamic Mysticism)

Trained scholars
Some of the known Shia Grand Ayatollahs were trained in the Najaf seminary.
Ahmad ibn Muhammad Ardabili - he was one of the most famous Shia scholars. He was known as Mohaghegh (researcher) and Moghaddas (saint).
Moḥammad Mahdī Baḥr al-ʿUlūm - he was known as Baḥr al-Ulum for his considerable knowledge. Bahr al-Ulum was a popular Shia Muslim scholar. He is specifically known as one of the few individuals who attained the climax of spiritual perfection.
Mohammad Bagher Shafti - he was the leader of Isfahan seminary.
Akhund Khorasani - he was a student of Morteza Ansari. Khorasani was the greatest Marjaʿ after Mirza Shirazi and before Mohammad Fadhil Sharabiani, he was known as an indubitable master of usul al-fiqh. He authored a book focused on commercial law.
Abu al-Qasim al-Khoei - Ali al-Sistani was his student. He was made the most prominent Grand Ayatollah in 1971 after the death of Muhsin al-Hakim. He was well-known author in Hadith studies and Rijal and Kalam knowledge.
Ibn Idris Hilli - he founded the Hillah seminary.
Mirza Shirazi - he was the leader of Samarra seminary and Tobacco Protest.
Hajj Muhammad Ibrahim Kalbasi - he was the leader of Isfahan seminary.
Abdul-Karim Haeri Yazdi - he was the founder of the Qom Seminary in Iran. Ruhollah Khomeini was his student. He was Marjaʿ.
Kashif al-Ghita - he was the leader and great Marjaʿ of Shia.
Muhammad Hasan al-Najafi - he authored Javaher al-kalam Fi sharh-e Sharay-e al-Islam and was a leader of the Najaf seminary.
Morteza Ansari - he was the leader of Najaf seminary after the death of Muhammad Hasan al-Najafi. He has been called "first effective" Marjaʿ of the Shia or "the first scholar universally recognized as supreme authority in matters of Shii law".
Seyyed Hossein Borujerdi - his popular students included Imam Khomeini, Hossein Vahid Khorasani, Sayed Ali Khamenei, Sayyid Ali al-Sistani, Lotfollah Safi Golpaygani, and Dr. Seyed Ali Mirlohi Falavarjani. Borujerdi was the sole marja "in the Shia world" from 1945-6 until his death in 1961. Borujerdi was the first Marja who attempted Islamic unity. He sent Sayyid Muhaqqiqi to Hamburg, Germany, Aqa-e-Shari'at to Karachi, Pakistan, Al-Faqihi to Medina and Musa al-Sadr to Lebanon.
Muhammad Husayn Tabataba'i - he authored Tafsir al-Mizan and he was one of the most prominent Intellectuals of philosophy and contemporary Shia Islam. He was an expert in philosophy in Islam. His philosophy is focused upon the sociological treatment of human problems. His book, Shi'ite Islam, was translated into English by Hossein Nasr and William Chittick as a project of Colgate University. He was interviewed by Henry Corbin.
Abd al-Husayn Sharaf al-Din al-Musawi - he was one of the greatest Marja in Lebanon. He attempted to bring Shia and Sunni closer.

See also
Marjaʿ
Lists of Maraji
Qom Seminary
Society of Seminary Teachers of Qom
Isfahan Seminary

References

External links
Towards an Understanding of the Shiite Authoritative Sources
Hawza Ilmiyya, Qom, Iran
Research centre of Hawza Ilmiyya, Qom, Iran 

Imam Hossain University (Howza)
Alqaem Institute
Hawza - Advanced Islamic Studies

 
Islamic education
Islamic terminology
Single-gender schools